Kappler or Käppler is a surname. Notable people with the surname include:

August Kappler (1815–1887), German researcher, naturalist and explorer from Mannheim
Bianca Kappler (born 1977), German long jumper
Chris Kappler (born 1967), American equestrian, showjumper and Olympic gold and silver medalist
Darren Kappler (born 1965), former professional Australian rules footballer
Emanuel Selway "Jack" Kappler (1892–1969), former Australian rules footballer
Herbert Kappler (1907–1978), head of German police and security forces in Rome during World War II
John Kappler (born 1943), professor in the Department of Integrated Immunology at National Jewish Health
Nathalie Käppler (formerly von Lahnstein), fictional character on the German soap opera Verbotene Liebe